Rick Fitts is an American film and television actor. He is known for playing the role of the ruthless businessman Martin Jackson on 120 episodes of the American soap opera television series Generations.

Fitts guest-starred in numerous television programs including Seinfeld, Star Trek: The Next Generation, Three's a Crowd, Coach, Diff'rent Strokes, Home Improvement, Desperate Housewives, The A-Team, The Fresh Prince of Bel-Air, Frasier, Diagnosis: Murder, Lois & Clark: The New Adventures of Superman, 227, The Redd Foxx Show, Star Trek: Voyager, The Steve Harvey Show, Roseanne, Hardcastle and McCormick, Benson, What's Happening Now!!, Andy Richter Controls the Universe, Jake and the Fatman, Over My Dead Body and Party of Five. He also appeared in films, such as, Summer Camp Nightmare, The Hanoi Hilton, The Kid with the Broken Halo, Banzai Runner, The West Side Waltz, Liz: The Elizabeth Taylor Story,  Platoon Leader, Grave Secrets: The Legacy of Hilltop Drive, Rescue Me and Naked. Fitts has also done voiceover work, supplying the voice of "Mr. Johanssen" in the animated series Hey Arnold!.

References

External links 
 

American male soap opera actors
American male television actors
American male film actors
Living people
Place of birth missing (living people)
Year of birth missing (living people)
20th-century American male actors
21st-century American male actors